Eugene Gerard "Gene" Laufenberg (born in Jersey City, New Jersey) is an American television writer and producer and director.

He started his career in television after securing a story editor's position the animated cult favorite Duckman.  He was eventually nominated for an Emmy Award. Laufenberg wrote and produced various other TV shows such as Clueless, She Spies and Family Guy.  After writing and directing the award-winning short Sunday's Game, Laufenberg obtained a two-picture deal with Fox 2000.

After obtaining a Masters in Clinical Psychology, Laufenberg became a licensed MFT in the state of California.**

He is currently a writer-executive producer of Boy Girl Dog Cat Mouse Cheese. The Boy Girl Dog Cat Mouse Cheese episode title "Greb Nefual E Neg" is "Gene Laufenberg" spelled backwards.

References

External links

American television directors
American television writers
American male television writers
Living people
Writers from Jersey City, New Jersey
Screenwriters from New Jersey
Television producers from New Jersey
Year of birth missing (living people)